Isaak Osipovich Dunayevsky (also transliterated as Dunaevski or Dunaevskiy; 25 July 1955) was a Soviet film composer and conductor of the 1930s and 1940s, who composed music for operetta and film comedies, frequently working with the film director Grigori Aleksandrov.

Biography

Dunayevsky was born to a Jewish family in Lokhvytsia in the Poltava Governorate of the Russian Empire (now Myrhorod Raion, Poltava Oblast, Ukraine) in 1900. He studied at the Kharkiv Musical School in 1910 where he studied violin under Konstanty Gorski and Joseph Achron. During this period he started to study the theory of music under Semyon Bogatyrev (1890–1960). He graduated in 1919 from the Kharkiv National Kotlyarevsky University of Arts. At first he was a violinist, the leader of the orchestra in Kharkov. Then he started a conducting career. In 1924 he went to Moscow to run the Theatre Hermitage. In 1929 he worked for the first time for a music hall ("To the icy place") with the Moscow music hall. Later, he worked in Leningrad (1929–1941) as a director and conductor of the Saint Petersburg Music Hall (1929–34), and then moved to Moscow to work on his own operettas and film music.

Dunayevsky wrote 14 operettas, 3 ballets, 3 cantatas, 80 choruses, 80 songs and romances, music for 88 plays and 42 films, 43 compositions for light music orchestra and 12 for jazz orchestra, 17 melodeclamations, 52 compositions for symphony orchestra and 47 piano compositions and a string quartet.

He was one of the first composers in the Soviet Union to start using jazz. He wrote the music for three of the most important films of the pre-war Stalinist era, Jolly Fellows, Circus and the film said to be Stalin's favorite film Volga-Volga, all directed by Grigori Aleksandrov.

In a reply to the British book The World of Music, he listed the following as his chief works: The Golden Valley operetta (1937), The Free Wind operetta (1947), and music to the films Circus (1935) and The Kuban Cossacks (1949).

He died of a heart attack in Moscow in 1955. His last piece, the operetta White Acacia (1955), was left unfinished at his death. It was completed by Kirill Molchanov and staged on 15 November 1955, in Moscow.

A previously unknown opera libretto Rachel (1943) by Mikhail Bulgakov, was later found in his archive. The libretto was based on Guy de Maupassant's Mademoiselle Fifi and was published in a book by Naum Shafer (see references and links below).

A book of his essays and memoirs was published in 1961.

Honors
Dunayevsky was named a People's Artist of the RSFSR in 1950. He was twice awarded the Stalin Prize (1941, 1951) and received two orders and many medals (including Order of the Red Banner of Labour, Order of the Red Star, and Order of the Badge of Honour).

Family
His brother Semyon (1906–1986) was a conductor; another brother, Zinovy (1908–1981), was a composer.

Dunayevsky was married once. He had a son Yevgeny (b. 1932) by his wife Zinaida Sudeikina, and another son Maksim (b. 1945) by his lover, the ballerina Zoya Pashkova (1922—30.01.1991). Maksim is also a well-known composer.

Works
The Tranquillity of the Faun, ballet (1924)
Murzilka, ballet for children (1924)
For Us and You, operetta (1924)
Bridegrooms (Женихи), operetta (1926)
The Knives (Ножи), operetta (1928)
To the icy place, operetta (1929)
Million Langours, operetta (1932)
Jolly Fellows (Весёлые ребята), film music (1934), including "Serdtse"
Three Friends (Три товарища), film music (1935) 
Late for a Date (Девушка спешит на свидание), film music (1936)
Seekers of Happiness (Искатели счастья), film music (1936)
Circus (Цирк), film music (1936) 
The Children of Captain Grant (Дети капитана Гранта), film music (1936) 
The Golden Valley (Золотая долина), operetta (1937)
Volga-Volga (Волга-Волга), film music (1938) 
The Roads to Happiness (Дороги к счастью), operetta (1939)
My Love (Моя любовь). film music (1940)
Moscow, suite for solo voices, chorus and orchestra (1941)
The Wind of Liberty (Вольный ветер), operetta (1947)
Cossacks of the Kuban (Кубанские казаки), film music (1949)
The Son of the Clown (Сын клоуна), operetta (1950)
Glory of the Railwaymen, cantata 
Our Homeland May Flourish!, cantata 
Ballet Suite for orchestra
Suite on Chinese themes, orchestra
Rhapsody on Songs of the people of the Soviet Union, jazz orchestra
The Music Store, jazz orchestra
String Quartet
Song of the Fatherland, film music
Requiem, narrator and quintet
Song of Stalin, chorus and orchestra
White Acacia (Белая акация), operetta (1955, completed by Kirill Molchanov)
 Quiet, Everything Quiet (Тихо, всё тихо), the sign-off tune of the Soviet television until 1991.

Also:
Songs
Pieces for chamber orchestra
Incidental music for theatre and cinema

External links
Isaak Dunayevsky: The Red Mozart Of Soviet Cinema
Famous Ukrainian Jews Commemorated on Postage Stamps-Isaak Dunayevsky
The heart grows light with a joyful song:120th birthday of Isaak Dunayevsky
Ovar
Naum Shafer, “Dunayevsky Today”)

See also
 Maksim Dunayevsky

Bibliography
Kommissarskaya, M Dunayevsky, the article in "Tvorcheskiye biografii Kompozitorov", Moscow, 1989 
Shafer, Naum “Dunayevsky Today” Moscow, Sovetsky Kompozitor, 1988

References 

1900 births
1955 deaths
20th-century classical musicians
20th-century composers
20th-century Ukrainian musicians
People from Poltava Oblast
People from Lokhvitsky Uyezd
Members of the Supreme Soviet of the Russian Soviet Federative Socialist Republic
People's Artists of the RSFSR
Stalin Prize winners
Recipients of the Order of the Red Banner of Labour
Recipients of the Order of the Red Star
Light music composers
Male film score composers
Male operetta composers
Jewish Ukrainian musicians
Jewish classical musicians
Jewish composers
Soviet classical musicians
Soviet film score composers
Soviet male composers
Burials at Novodevichy Cemetery